is a 1988 adventure video game by TOSE for the Family Computer console exclusively in Japan. It is based on Akira, the 1988 animated film version of Katsuhiro Otomo's manga of the same name.

Plot 
The player takes the role of Kaneda, who begins the game when his motorcycle gang is taken into police custody after the abduction of their friend Tetsuo by the military.

Gameplay
Progress in the game is made by selecting actions from a list. The current location is depicted in a static image, often redrawn from the film. Progress can be recorded with the help of passwords.

Development 
The game was developed by TOSE and published by Taito.

Release 
The game was released in Japan on December 24, 1988. It was released only 5 months after the film. The release coincided with the height of the popularity of the Akira series.

Reception
Akira was given a poor total score of 17 out of 40 from the panel of four reviewers of Famicom Tsūshin magazine.

See also
List of Family Computer games

References

External links
Official Taito website 

Akira (franchise)
1988 video games
Amiga CD32 games
Cyberpunk video games
Japan-exclusive video games
Nintendo Entertainment System games
Nintendo Entertainment System-only games
Post-apocalyptic video games
Single-player video games
Video games about psychic powers
Video games based on anime and manga
Video games developed in Japan
Video games set in 2019
Visual novels